Azovsky District is an administrative and municipal district (raion), one of the forty-three in Rostov Oblast, Russia. It is located in the southwest of the oblast. Its administrative center is the town of Azov (which is not administratively a part of the district). Population: 93,579 (2010 Census);

Administrative and municipal status
Within the framework of administrative divisions, Azovsky District is one of the forty-three in the oblast. The town of Azov serves as its administrative center, despite being incorporated separately as an urban okrug—an administrative unit with the status equal to that of the districts.

As a municipal division, the district is incorporated as Azovsky Municipal District. Azov Urban Okrug is incorporated separately from the district.

References

Notes

Sources



Districts of Rostov Oblast